The 1989 Grambling State Tigers football team represented Grambling State University as a member of the Southwestern Athletic Conference (SWAC) during the 1989 NCAA Division I-AA football season. Led by 47th-year head coach Eddie Robinson, the Tigers compiled an overall record of 9–3 and a mark of 7–0 in conference play, and finished as SWAC champion.

Schedule

References

Grambling State
Grambling State Tigers football seasons
Southwestern Athletic Conference football champion seasons
Grambling State Tigers football